Thraso, latinized as Thrason, was an Indo-Greek king in Central and Western Punjab, unknown until the 1982 discovery of one of his coins by R. C. Senior in the Surana hoard. The coin is in a style similar to those of Menander I, has the same type of Athena, and shares one of Menander's mint marks. On the coin, the title of Thraso is Basileus Megas ("Great King"), a title which only Eucratides the Great had dared take before him and which is seemingly misplaced on the young boy Thraso, whose single preserved coin indicates a small and insignificant reign.

Osmund Bopearachchi suggests a preliminary dating of 95–80 BC, but Senior himself concludes that Thraso was the son and heir of Menander (c. 155–130 BC), since his coin was not worn and was found in a hoard with only earlier coins.

It seems as though the child was briefly raised to the throne in the turmoil following the death of Menander, by a general who thought the grandiloquent title might strengthen his case.

Notes

References
 R. C. Senior, The Indo-Greek and Indo-Scythian King Sequences in the Second and First Centuries BC, ONS 179 Supplement.

Indo-Greek kings
2nd-century BC rulers in Asia